Emirates Crown is a 63-floor residential tower in Dubai, United Arab Emirates, developed by Bin Shafar Holding and designed by Design & Architecture Bureau. The tower has a structural height of 296 m (971 ft). Construction of the Emirates Crown began in 2005, and was completed in 2008. Upon completion, it stood as the sixth-tallest building in Dubai, and 45th-tallest building in the world. As of 2022, it is the 26th-tallest building in Dubai.

Two to five bedroom apartments can be found in the building, as well as some of the most prominent penthouses in Dubai. The amenities include a gymnasium, sauna, Jacuzzi, kids club, swimming pool, steam room and private storage. Located right across the street from the Dubai International Marine Club in the Dubai Marina district, it is a common living location for yachting enthusiasts.

See also 
 List of tallest buildings in Dubai
 List of tallest residential buildings in Dubai
 List of tallest buildings in the United Arab Emirates
 List of tallest residential buildings

References

External links 

 Emirates Crown on CTBUH Skyscraper Center
Emirates Crown on Emporis.com
Emirates Crown on SkyscraperPage.com
Emirates Crown on Luxhabitat.ae

Residential buildings completed in 2008
Residential skyscrapers in Dubai